Alexander Ivanovich Oparin (– April 21, 1980) was a Soviet biochemist notable for his theories about the origin of life, and for his book The Origin of Life. He also studied the biochemistry of material processing by plants and enzyme reactions in plant cells. He showed that many food production processes were based on biocatalysis and developed the foundations for industrial biochemistry in the USSR.

Life
Born in Uglich in 1894, Oparin graduated from the Moscow State University in 1917 and became a professor of biochemistry there in 1927. Many of his early papers were about plant enzymes and their role in metabolism. In 1924 he put forward a hypothesis suggesting that life on Earth developed through a gradual chemical evolution of carbon-based molecules in the Earth's primordial soup. In 1935, along with academician Alexey Bakh, he founded the Biochemistry Institute of the Soviet Academy of Sciences. In 1939, Oparin became a Corresponding Member of the Academy, and, in 1946, a full member. In 1940s and 1950s he supported the theories of Trofim Lysenko and Olga Lepeshinskaya, who made claims about "the origin of cells from noncellular matter". "Taking the party line" helped advance his career. In 1970, he was elected President of the International Society for the Study of the Origins of Life. He died in Moscow on April 21, 1980, and was interred in Novodevichy Cemetery in Moscow.

Oparin became Hero of Socialist Labour in 1969, received the Lenin Prize in 1974 and was awarded the Lomonosov Gold Medal in 1979 "for outstanding achievements in biochemistry". He was also a five-time recipient of the Order of Lenin.

Theory of the origin of life

Although Oparin's started out reviewing various panspermia theories, including those of Hermann von Helmholtz and William Thomson (Lord Kelvin), he was primarily interested in how life began. As early as 1922, he asserted that:

 There is no fundamental difference between a living organism and lifeless matter. The complex combination of manifestations and properties characteristic of life must have arisen as a part of the process of the evolution of matter.
 Taking into account the recent discovery of methane in the atmospheres of Jupiter and the other giant planets, Oparin suggested that the infant Earth had possessed a strongly reducing atmosphere, containing methane, ammonia, hydrogen and water vapor. In his opinion, these were the raw materials for the evolution of life.
 In Oparin's formulation, there were first only simple solutions of organic matter, the behavior of which was governed by the properties of their component atoms and the arrangement of these atoms into a molecular structure. Gradually though, he said, the resulting growth and increased complexity of molecules brought new properties into being and a new colloidal-chemical order developed as a successor to more simple relationships between and among organic chemicals. These newer properties were determined by the interactions of these more complex molecules.
 Oparin posited that this process brought biological orderliness into prominence. According to Oparin, competition, speed of cell growth, survival of the fittest, struggle for existence and, finally, natural selection determined the form of material organization characteristic of modern-day living things. 
 
Oparin outlined a way he thought that basic organic chemicals might have formed into microscopic localized systems, from which primitive living things could have developed. He cited work done by de Jong and Sidney W. Fox on coacervates and research by others, including himself, into organic chemicals which, in solution, might spontaneously form droplets and layers. Oparin suggested that different types of coacervates could have formed in the Earth's primordial ocean and been subject to a selection process that led, eventually, to life.

While Oparin himself was unable to conduct experiments to test any of these ideas, later researchers tried. In 1953, Stanley Miller attempted an experiment to investigate whether chemical self-organization could have been possible on pre-historic Earth. The Miller–Urey experiment introduced heat (to provide reflux) and electrical energy (sparks, to simulate lightning) into a mixture of several simple components that would be present in a reducing atmosphere. Within a fairly short period of time a variety of familiar organic compounds, such as amino acids, were synthesised. The compounds that formed were somewhat more complex than the molecules present at the beginning of the experiment.

The influence of dialectical materialism on Oparin's theory
The Communist Party's official interpretation of Marxism, dialectical materialism, fit Oparin's speculation on the origins of life as 'a flow, an exchange, a dialectical unity'. This notion was re-enforced by Oparin's association with Lysenko.

Major works
 Oparin, A. I. Proiskhozhdenie zhizni. Moscow: Izd. Moskovskii Rabochii, 1924. 
 English translations: 
 Oparin, A. I. "The origin of life", translation by Ann Synge. In: Bernal, J. D. (ed.), The origin of life, Weidenfeld & Nicolson, London, 1967, p. 199–234. Google, Valencia University.
 Oparin, A. I. The Origin and Development of Life (NASA TTF-488). Washington: D.C.L GPO, 1968.
 Oparin, A. I. Vozniknovenie zhizni na zemle. Moscow: Izd. Akad. Nauk SSSR, 1936.
 English translations:
 Oparin, A. I. The Origin of Life, 1st ed., New York: Macmillan, 1938.
 Oparin, A. I. The Origin of Life, 2nd ed., New York: Dover, 1953, reprinted in 2003, Google.
 Oparin, A. I. The Origin of Life on the Earth, 3rd ed., New York: Academic Press, 1957, BHL
 Oparin, A., Fesenkov, V. Life in the Universe. Moscow: USSR Academy of Sciences publisher, 3rd edition, 1956. 
 English translation: Oparin, A., and V. Fesenkov. Life in the Universe. New York: Twayne Publishers (1961).
 "The External Factors in Enzyme Interactions Within a Plant Cell"
 "Life, Its Nature, Origin and Evolution"
 "The History of the Theory of Genesis and Evolution of Life"

See also

 Abiogenesis
 Biochemistry
 List of independent discoveries ("Primordial soup" theory of the origin of life from carbon-based molecules, 1924)
 Microsphere
 Oparin Medal
 Proteinoid
 Sidney W. Fox
 Stanley Miller

References

1894 births
1980 deaths
Burials at Novodevichy Cemetery
Heroes of Socialist Labour
Kalinga Prize recipients
Lenin Prize winners
Full Members of the USSR Academy of Sciences
Moscow State University alumni
People from Uglich

Soviet biochemists
Soviet biologists
Origin of life
Members of the German Academy of Sciences at Berlin
Proceedings of the USSR Academy of Sciences editors